Andrzej Pogorzelski (12 October 1938 – 16 October 2020) was a Polish motorcycle speedway rider and coach.

Career
He started his career in Unia Leszno and represented the club in 1956 and 1973-1976 seasons. While at Unia Leszno he won 2 bronze medals (1975, 1976) on Team Speedway Polish Championship. During the 1957-1961 seasons he rode in Start Gniezno and moved to Stal Gorzów Wielkopolski in winter 1962. While in Stal he won 1 gold (1969) and 5 silver (1964, 1965, 1966, 1968, 1971) medals in Team Speedway Polish Championship.

During riding for Stal he held double record of the track in Gorzow Wielkopolski in seasons 1964 (76.4 sec - 18/10/1964) and 1969 (73.3 sec - 18/05/1969).

Andrzej won 3 bronze medals in the Polish Individual Speedway Championship (1964, 1965, 1966). He also won the Golden Helmet tournament in 1966, in 1964  (2nd place),  1965  (2nd place)   and 1969  (2nd place),  and was finalist in the Silver Helmet tournament of the season 1962  (3rd place).

International appearances
Six-time finalist of the Speedway World Team Cup, where together with the Polish National Team he won 3 gold (1965, 1966, 1969)  and 1 silver medal (1967), and finished in 4th place twice (1963, 1964).

Finalist of the Speedway World Championship in seasons: 1965  (9th place),  1966  (12th place),  1967  (9th place) and  1969  (9th place).

After retirement
After his career he competed in the many tournaments among others, for example in Edward Jancarz Memorial and he won significant achievements as a speedway coach.

Pogorzelski died on 16 October 2020, aged 82.

Monuments and plaques
Commemorative plaque at the Stal's Edward Jancarz Stadium unveiled on 18 December 2015.

World Final Appearances

Individual World Championship
 1965 -  London, Wembley Stadium -  9th - 7pts
 1966 -  Göteborg, Ullevi - 12th - 5pts
 1967 -  London, Wembley Stadium -  9th - 6pts
 1969 -  London, Wembley Stadium -  9th - 7pts

World Team Cup
 1963 -  Vienna, Stadion Wien (with Henryk Żyto / Marian Kaiser / Joachim Maj / Stanisław Tkocz) - 4th - 7pts (0)
 1964 -  Abensberg, Abensberg Speedwaystadion (with Zbigniew Podlecki / Andrzej Wyglenda / Marian Kaiser / Marian Rose) - 4th - 16pts (3)
 1965 -  Kempten (with Andrzej Wyglenda / Zbigniew Podlecki / Antoni Woryna) - Winner - 38pts (11)
 1966 -  Wrocław, Olympic Stadium (with Andrzej Wyglenda / Antoni Woryna / Marian Rose / Edmund Migoś) - Winner - 41pts (8)
 1967 -  Malmö, Malmö Stadion (with Jerzy Trzeszkowski / Antoni Woryna / Andrzej Wyglenda / Zbigniew Podlecki) - 2nd - 26pts (0)
 1969 -  Rybnik, Rybnik Municipal Stadium (with Edward Jancarz / Stanisław Tkocz / Andrzej Wyglenda / Henryk Glücklich) - 'Winner - 31pts (2)

References

External links
 Polish Speedway Database - Andrzej Pogorzelski
 Press articles about Andrzej Pogorzelski

1938 births
People from Leszno
Motorcycle sportspeople
Polish speedway riders
2020 deaths
Sportspeople from Greater Poland Voivodeship
Polish sportsmen